The Okhotsk culture is an archaeological coastal fishing and hunter-gatherer culture that developed around the southern coastal regions of the Sea of Okhotsk, including Sakhalin, northeastern Hokkaido, and the Kuril Islands during the last half of the first millennium to the early part of the second. The Okhotsk are one of the ancestral components of the Ainu people and probably contributed the Ainu languages and significant cultural elements. It is suggested that the bear cult, a practice shared by various Northern Eurasian peoples, the Ainu and the Nivkhs, was an important element of the Okhotsk culture but was uncommon in Jomon period Japan. Archaeological evidence indicates that the Okhotsk culture proper originated in the 5th century AD from the Susuya culture of southern Sakhalin and northern Hokkaido.

Etymology 
The Okhotsk culture is named after the eponymous Sea of Okhotsk, which is named after the Okhota river, which is in turn named after the Even word  meaning "river".

History
Kisao Ishizuki of the Sapporo University suggests that the people of the Okhotsk culture were recorded under the name Mishihase on the Japanese record Nihon Shoki, while others suggest that the term Mishihase described a different group or one of the Nivkh tribes.
The Nihon Shoki (AD 720) includes the following entry for the year 544:

The name is written with Chinese characters referring to a people from Manchuria who appear in Chinese records as early as the 6th century BC. The name Sushen is believed to denote a Tungusic people who were ancestral to the Mohe and Jurchen (Aston 1972, II, 58). The anachronistic use of ‘Sushen’ in Japanese records a thousand years after the name was first used in China was an attempt to give legitimacy to Japan’s early state. In the Japanese context, the term Sushen is probably best interpreted as a traditional label for a ‘northern people’ rather than a specific ethnic group from Manchuria. According to later entries in the Nihon Shoki, the Sushen also lived in Hokkaido.  During the reign of the empress Saimei (r. 655–661), Abe no Omi, Warden of the Province of Koshi (modern-day Hokuriku region), was sent on several military expeditions to the north by the Yamato state based in western Japan. During these expeditions, the main enemies of Abe no Omi were the Sushen, who were attacking the Emishi people. In the third month of 660:

There was rapid disappearance of Okhotsk sites and artifacts from the Kuril archipelago. As identified in the radiocarbon record of the Kuril Islands, a drastic decline in radiocarbon dates occurs around 800 BP with almost no radiocarbon samples providing a date between 600 and 400 BP. In Hokkaido, the absence of Okhotsk remains after 800 BP is largely considered to be a product of assimilation of Okhotsk culture into the neighboring and contemporaneous Satsumon culture of southern and western Hokkaido. With the onset of yet another cold period, the Little Ice Age, it can be hypothesized that the exchange relationships the Kuril Okhotsk maintained with populations in Kamchatka did not provide the necessary access to materials or exchange partnerships to remain viable in the central and north central regions. With increasing long winters, more difficult travel conditions and potentially less demand or increased costs for marine products, the incentives for continued habitation in the remote Kurils may have declined. Given the concurrent combination of economic, social and environmental factors constraining habitation of this region, Okhotsk populations may simply have chosen to abandon their settlements in the Kuril Islands.

Genetics 
Morphological studies of the skeletal remains of the Okhotsk people have suggested their similarity to populations currently living around the Amur Basin and in northern Sakhalin (Ishida 1988, 1996; Komesu et al. 2008). In addition, the results of mitochondrial DNA analysis support the morphological evidence. Mitochondrial DNA haplogroups Y1, G1b, and N9b, which were shared among the Lower Amur populations at high frequencies, were commonly detected from Okhotsk skeletal remains (Sato et al. 2009b), which suggests that the Okhotsk people originated in the Lower Amur region. The mitochondrial haplogroup frequencies in 37 Okhotsk skeletal remains from a 2009 study were as follows: A, 8.1%; B5, 2.7%; C3, 5.4%; G1, 24.3%; M7, 5.4%; N9, 10.8%; Y, 43.2%. Thus, in the mitochondrial gene pool of the Okhotsk people, haplogroup Y was major. This genetic feature is similar to those of populations currently living around the lower regions of the Amur River, such as the Ulchi, Nivkhi, and Negidals. The findings show that the Okhotsk people are genetically closer to populations currently living around the lower regions of the Amur River as well as to the Ainu people of Hokkaido. Moreover, the study indicates that the Okhotsk people were also affected by gene flow from the Kamchatka peninsula.

Connection to modern populations 
According to Kikuchi Toshihiko from the Hokkaido University, the Okhotsk people, which were mainly based in northern Hokkaido, are direct ancestral to the Ainu and can be considered as "proto-Ainu". The Ainu ethnicity finally formed through the combination of these proto-Ainu Okhotsk and Satsumon tribes from further south. Later the Ainu rapidly expanded into Sakhalin and Kamchatka as well as northern Honshu. The Okhotsk culture appears directly ancestral to the following Ainu culture.

A study in 2021 (Sato et al.) analyzed the indigenous populations of northern Japan and the Russian Far East. They concluded that Siberia and northern Japan was populated by two distinct waves: "the southern migration wave seems to have diversified into the local populations in East Asia (defined in this paper as a region including China, Japan, Korea, Mongol, and Taiwan) and Southeast Asia, and the northern wave, which probably runs through the Siberian and Eurasian steppe regions."

The Okhotsk culture was found to be an important contributor to the formation of the modern Ainu people. Archaeologists have considered that bear worship, which is a religious practice widely observed among the northern Eurasian ethnic groups, including the Ainu, Finns, Nivkh, and Sami, was also shared by the Okhotsk people. On the other hand, no traces of such a religious practice have ever been discovered from archaeological sites of the Jomon and Epi-Jomon periods, which were anterior to the Ainu cultural period. Bear worship in the Ainu culture is seen in iomante, a ceremony in which a bear is sacrificed and its spirit is sent to the world of kamuy. For the Okhotsk culture, the enshrined skulls of brown bears have been discovered in some dwelling sites, suggesting a religious custom associated with bear worship. This implies that the Okhotsk culture contributed to the forming of the Ainu culture."

A genetic study in 2021 (Sato et al.) found that the Ainu derived about ~49% of their ancestry from the Hokkaido Jōmon, ~22% from the Okhotsk (samplified by Chukotko-Kamchatkan peoples), and ~29% from the Yamato Japanese. The Okhotsk people had higher genetic affinities with the Nivkh and Ulchi, as well as with the Ainu, among the compared northeastern Asian populations. The Nivkh, Ulchi and Ainu populations are currently distributed in areas geographically close to the Okhotsk culture sites.

Subsistence 
A distinctive trait of the Okhotsk culture was its subsistence strategy, traditionally categorised as a specialised system of marine resource gathering. This is in accord with the geographic distribution of archeological sites in coastal regions and confirmed by studies of animal remains and tools, that pointed to intensive marine hunting, fishing, and gathering activities. Stable nitrogen isotope studies in human remains also point to a diet with rich protein intake derived from marine organisms. Collagen analysis of human bones revealed a relative contribution of marine protein in a range of 60 to 94% for individuals from Rebun Island and from 80 to 90% for individuals from eastern Hokkaido. However, there is enough evidence to suggest that the Okhotsk people's diet was much more diverse than isotopic data suggests. Their diet was probably complemented with terrestrial mammals, such as deer, foxes, rabbits, and martens. Cut marks in domesticated dog bones suggest they were also part of the diet, and remains of domestic pigs are limited to the north of Hokkaido. There is also evidence of the use of cultivation of barley and foraging of wild plants, including Aralia, Polygonum, Actinidia, Vitis, Sambucus, crowberry, Rubus sp., Phellodendron amurense, and Juglans. Little is known about the role of these plants in the economy or if they had dietary or ritual roles.

Economy 
Kikuchi has shown that many of the bronzes and other exotic artifacts found in Okhotsk sites originated in Manchuria and the Russian Far East. At the same time, it has long been suggested that trade in animal furs was a significant component of the Okhotsk economy. However, there is little evidence to suggest the importance of long-distance trade or specialized production for exchange. Objects clearly obtained through trade with areas outside the Okhotsk culture are rare. Most such objects come from two sites, Menashi-domari and Moyoro, and few trade goods have been found at Okhotsk sites in the Soya Straits or on Sakhalin. The available archaeological and documentary evidence, therefore, lends little support to suggestions that the Okhotsk people were heavily involved in trading sea mammal products to Manchuria or Japan. Compositional analysis of pottery and obsidian demonstrate that Okhotsk populations living in the remote Kuril Islands had broader and more dense exchange networks as compared to Epi-Jomon populations. In particular, obsidian sourcing demonstrates the extensive procurement and use of Kamchatka obsidian by Okhotsk populations inhabiting the remote islands.

Culture

Pottery 

Pottery produced by the Okhotsk is flat based and has a plain body. Decoration is concentrated around the exterior of the rim showing several types of easily distinguishable decorative motifs. The Okhotsk cultural sequence can be divided into four stages in northern Hokkaido, according to the four main styles of pottery. Given the challenges associated with the dating of Okhotsk culture assemblages – as most datable materials are heavily exposed to marine reservoir effects – most chronological work on the Okhotsk is based on comparative analyses of pottery and seriation. The most distinctive and common external feature of Okhotsk ceramic containers is the thick residual organic residue inside and outside the orifice and on the upper part of the walls, and sometimes in the lower part as well. Phosphate chemical analysis of the residue reveals a high content of phosphorus, which indicates an animal origin of organic matter rich in fat. The main function of this pottery was cooking animal products.

Pottery assemblages from the late stage of the Okhotsk culture provide evidence of certain innovations. These include the somewhat diminishing role of large cooking vessels and the appearance of a series of small, wide-mouthed pots. This phenomenon may be explained by social, ecological, and technological changes that occurred in the late stage of the Okhotsk culture, spanning the 10th to 13th centuries. During this period a growth in the use of imported metal items took place. Some sites contain evidence of iron cauldrons obviously used for cooking. Such containers are much more effective and long-Iasting than non-hermetic and fragile ceramic vessels. Considering the harsh climatic conditions of Sakhalin, which is problematic for pottery making, the gradual decline of this craft with the arrival of metal pots is likely.

Some sites attributed to the Okhotsk reveal the remains of thermal structures used for heating and cooking. These structures were built of clay or stone slabs and located inside pit houses. Thermal structures for heating and cooking are known in archaeological sites on Hokkaido dated to the 6th or 7th to the 12th or 13th centuries. These data may be interpreted as probable evidence that the Okhotsk people were acquainted with the principles of thermal processes and built special thermal structures not only for heating and cooking but also for primitive metalworking and pottery firing.

Religion 
The Okhotsk from Rebun Island transported adult bears and bear cubs (Ursus arctos) from the Hokkaido mainland for ceremonial activities, while also practicing small-scale pig (Sus scrofa inoi) and dog (Canis domesticus) rearing.

Ten ivory figurines depicting females with elaborate clothing are known from Okhotsk sites in both northern and eastern Hokkaido. A baby quadruped on a figurine from the Hamanaka 2 site on Rebun has been interpreted as a bear cub by Maeda. If correct, this may link women with the raising of bears for rituals. This is important because bears probably became ‘‘socially valued goods’’ in Okhotsk society and a DNA analysis of brown bear remains from Kafukai has shown that juvenile bears were brought by boat from southwest Hokkaido to Rebun Island. Bear rituals were important in Okhotsk households but there is no evidence (from burials for example) that female status increased because of their involvement in shamanistic activities related to bear ceremonies.

Like the Ainu, the Okhotsk also appear to have engaged in the rearing of live bear cubs, and these earlier traditions appear to be the origins of later Ainu practices. Many interpretations of the significance of Okhotsk human-animal interactions draw on direct historical analogies with the Ainu. The parallels are often striking – for example, in almost all households of the Okhotsk Culture, bear crania are gathered in the sacred rear part of the house and placed on a special raised platform shrine – this may have formed a sacred area where likely only certain members of the group are given access. Many Okhotsk Culture sites also contain abundant evidence for a much wider repertoire of elaborate and deeply respectful animal-related mythology, including animal burials, clusters of animal bones subjected to ritualised treatments, with some clusters found in association with elaborate carved objects, that together may have been utilised as part of specific rituals.

Another dimension to human-animal cosmological relations is the sanctity of shell middens. Again, there appears to be deep continuity between traditions of the Okhotsk and Ainu cultures. In the Ainu culture, shell middens comprise a wide range of marine fauna, such as abalone shells, which are not viewed as discarded food or refuse, but rather sacred areas belonging to the spirits and ancestors. In and around these shell middens, animals, plants, tools, and other objects important to the Ainu are deposited – and sent back to the deities – through the celebration of sending rites. This tradition aligns well with the material culture and settlement patterning witnessed at numerous Okhotsk sites, where shell middens accumulate around the habitats and other social spaces. Plenty of material evidence suggests that rituals were performed around these areas, and for instance at the Hamanaka 2 site several human and dog burials were documented in shell midden contexts. The Okhotsk may therefore have regarded shell middens similarly, or even passed on this tradition to the Ainu in the early 2nd millennium.

References

External links 
 
 

Archaeological cultures of Siberia
Archaeological cultures of East Asia
History of Hokkaido
Ainu people
Kuril Islands